Paweł Śmiłowski (born 26 August 1998) is a Polish badminton player. Born in Białystok, Śmiłowski started to playing badminton at the age of six and join a local club Hubal Białystok. He was the bronze medalists at the 2017 European Junior Championships in the boys' and mixed doubles event. He won his first senior international title at the 2017 Slovak Open in the mixed doubles event partnered with Magdalena Świerczyńska.

Śmiłowski educated at the University of Physical Education and Tourism in Bialystok.

Achievements

European Junior Championships 
Boys' doubles

Mixed doubles

BWF International Challenge/Series (5 titles, 8 runners-up) 
Men's doubles

Mixed doubles

  BWF International Challenge tournament
  BWF International Series tournament
  BWF Future Series tournament

References

External links 
 

1998 births
Living people
Sportspeople from Białystok
Polish male badminton players
Badminton players at the 2019 European Games
European Games competitors for Poland